Nagma Arvind Morarji (born Nandita Arvind Morarji on 25 December 1974) is an Indian politician and former actress. She was a popular lead actress in the 1990s. She made her cinematic debut in the film Baaghi opposite Salman Khan in 1990. It was Hindi cinema's seventh highest-grossing film of the year. She is known for her roles in films like Gharana Mogudu (1992), King Uncle (1993), Suhaag (1994),   Kadhalan (1994), Baashha (1995) and Lal Baadshah (1999). She began her acting career in Bollywood. Nagma has acted in a broad range of films in India's languages predominantly in  Telugu, Tamil, Hindi and Bhojpuri Films and has also additionally appeared in several other regional language pictures- such as Malayalam, Kannada, Bengali, Punjabi Marathi and Mandarin/Cantonese films.

Early life 
Nagma was born as Nandita Arvind Morarji on 25 December 1974. Her father Arvind Morarji, whose forefathers hailed from Jaisalmer, later migrating to Porbandar, Gujarat and finally Mumbai. Her grandfather Gokuldas Morarji was a reputed businessman in the shipping, textile, agricultural and pharmaceutical industries. Her mother Seema, originally named Shama Kazi, is a Muslim belonging to the Kazi freedom fighter family. She married Morarji in 1969 at the CCI Club in Mumbai, but separated from him in 1974. After divorcing Morarji in August 1974, Nagma's mother married Chander Sadanah, a film producer in March 1975 with whom she had three children: including two daughters, actresses Jyothika and Roshini (born Radhika).

Nagma did her schooling from Mount Mary Convent High School, Mumbai. She is a Bachelor of Commerce graduate from National College, Mumbai University.

Nagma remained close to her biological father until his death on 31 December 2005. She explained to a Mumbai reporter "I am proud of the fact that I belong to a respectable family. My mother was legally married to my father, the late Shri Arvind Morarji, at a public function at the CCI Club, Mumbai." It was Nagma's mother who encouraged her to become an actress and is said to have been her "constant companion on the film sets" for several years.

Acting career 

Nagma's debut film Baghi: A Rebel for Love, opposite Salman Khan was Hindi cinema's seventh highest-grossing film in 1990. With Karisma Kapoor, she was also one of the female leads in 1994's Suhaag with Ajay Devgan and Akshay Kumar. Following these films, she acted in regional cinema to star in Telugu and Tamil films at the behest of her friend Divya Bharti. Explaining her shift, she cited what she was more conscious of the quality of work, in terms of meaty roles and her flair to travel throughout India understanding different cultures and her drive and passion to get acclamation from all over India. She stated "Language was never a barrier. I love adventure, culture and have great respect for the Indian tradition".

Her Telugu films include Gharana Mogudu with Chiranjeevi, Allari Alludu with Nagarjuna Akkineni and Major Chandrakanth with N. T. Rama Rao and Mohan Babu. Her Tamil films include  Kadhalan with Prabhu Deva, Baashha with Rajinikanth and Villadhi Villain with Sathyaraj in which she played her most glamour part and begin to tempt the Tamil audience and her performance gained her a unanimous praises for her glamour role time.

After moving back to Mumbai, she focused on supporting roles in Hindi films like the 2000s Chal Mere Bhai, which reunited her with former co-stars Karisma Kapoor, Salman Khan and Sanjay Dutt. While based in Mumbai, she continued to work in some Telugu and Tamil films, such as Allari Ramudu and Citizen, as well as taking leading roles in some Malayalam films including Chathurangam.

Nagma has acted in Bhojpuri films, including films with the Big Boss participant Ravi Kishan. She won a Best Actress award at the 2005 Bhojpuri Film Awards for her performance in Dulha Milal Dildar. In 2006's Ganga, she starred in the title role opposite Amitabh Bachchan and Hema Malini. When asked why she shifted to Bhojpuri films, she said "I wanted to do films in different languages. I have already done films in 10 languages. My first Bhojpuri film Panditji Bataayina Biyaah Kab Hoii was a huge hit. After that, the offers poured in and they were too good to be ignored." When interviewed by The Hindu in Delhi in April 2007, she indicated that another important reason for her decision to focus on Bhojpuri films was to help with her political campaigning.

In 2006, she made her Punjabi film debut, starring alongside Raj Babbar in Ek Jind Ek Jaan.

Discussing her career in a Mid-Day interview in September 2006, Nagma said "I have learned nine languages, so I want to do films in all languages. On the Hindi film front, I am in the process of signing a very big period thriller. I am getting to do a variety of roles with content, so I am satisfied." While noting her commitment to complete several Bhojpuri films she was involved with, in March 2007, she expressed her intention to next focus on returning to Hindi films after wrapping up her projects. In her 2007 Hindustan Times interview, in which she discusses her future plans for cinema and politics, Nagma responded to a question about her reputation for controversy by saying "You need guts to deal with controversies. Of course, whether it’s for negative or positive reasons, I’ve always been in the news."

Politics 

It was reported that Bharatiya Janata Party (BJP), wanted to field Nagma as a candidate from Hyderabad for the 2004 General Lok Sabha Elections. But she decided to join Congress in 2004 and campaigned in Andhra Pradesh.
She cited Congress Party's "commitment towards secularism and welfare of the poor and weaker sections" as her reason for joining.  Later, after joining the Congress, Nagma has reportedly said that she first supported the Congress Party because of her admiration for Rajiv Gandhi.

She contested 2014 Lok Sabha elections from Meerut as Congress candidate, securing fourth position with 42,911votes, She lost her deposit.

In a 2006 interview, she made a direct link between her family history and her political activism: "My mom is Muslim and my dad is Hindu. We were brought up to respect all religions.She said I personally experienced the Love of Jesus Christ from early on and His uniqueness and identifies herself as a Christian. Communal riots pained me. I wanted to do something. So I joined politics.". She had to turn down an offer to run for India's Lok Sabha in 2003 due to her many film commitments. "If I wanted to become a member of Parliament I would need to give 100 per cent to my constituency — which I could not at that point of time." In an interview with the Hindustan Times in 2007, she said "politics will continue".

Nagma was appointed the general secretary of All India Mahila Congress in 2015.

Filmography

Awards and nominations 
She is a recipient of Bhojpuri Film Awards two times. She won Best Actress at the first Bhojpuri Film Awards for her performance in Dulha Milal Dildar. Later in 2007, she was honoured again for the same for the 2006 film Ganga, in which she played the titular role.

She was nominated at Filmfare Awards South for her work in Telugu and Tamil film industry. She was seen as the female lead in Gharana Mogudu , Telugu-language film directed by K. Raghavendra Rao, opposite Chiranjeevi,for which she was nominated her first Filmfare Award for Best Actress – Telugu. She lost the award to Revathy  for  Ankuram . Second time, she was nominated for the Filmfare Award for Best Actress – Tamil at  42nd Filmfare Awards South, for her role in Kadhalan, but lost to Revathi again for Priyanka, but the team won Best Director – Tamil for S. Shankar & Music Director – Tamil for A. R. Rahman.

In 2013, the Jaipur International Film Festival (JIFF) decided to honour Nagma with a lifetime achievement award, but issued the award to Sharmila Tagore instead. Nagma, who was 39 years old at the time, said, "I thought I was too young for the award, but they convinced me. They said I had been selected because of my contribution to Indian cinema". JIFF's director, Hanuman Chaudhary, said that the change was due to Nagma not responding to their invitation, but Nagma recounted to Times of India that she accepted their invitation officially.

See also
 List of Bhojpuri cinema actresses

References

External links 
 

1974 births
Living people
Actresses in Malayalam cinema
Indian film actresses
Actresses from Mumbai
Actresses in Telugu cinema
Actresses in Tamil cinema
Actresses in Kannada cinema
Actresses in Hindi cinema
Actresses in Bhojpuri cinema
Actresses in Bengali cinema
Filmfare Awards South winners
20th-century Indian actresses
21st-century Indian actresses
United Progressive Alliance candidates in the 2014 Indian general election
Women in Delhi politics
Indian actor-politicians
Indian Christians
Indian National Congress politicians from Andhra Pradesh
21st-century Indian women politicians
21st-century Indian politicians
Converts to Christianity from Islam
Actresses in Punjabi cinema
Actresses in Marathi cinema